The 89th District of the Iowa House of Representatives in the state of Iowa.

Current elected officials
Monica Kurth is the representative currently representing the district.

Past representatives
The district has previously been represented by:
 Herbert L. Campbell, 1971–1973
 Charles N. Poncy, 1973–1979
 Sonja Larsen, 1979–1981
 Charles N. Poncy, 1981–1983
 Jo Ann Zimmerman, 1983–1987
 Wayne McKinney, 1987–1993
 Linda Beatty, 1993–1995
 Brian Coon, 1995–1997
 Steve Richardson, 1997–2003
 Sandy Greiner, 2003–2009
 Larry Marek, 2009–2011
 Jarad Klein, 2011–2013
 Jim Lykam, 2013–2017
 Monica Kurth, 2017–present

References

089